Clare Gilbert is a professor and a researcher who focuses on blindness in children based at the London School of Hygiene and Tropical Medicine (LSHTM).

Education and training 

Gilbert was born in Croydon and educated at Croydon High School for Girls GPDST. She qualified in medicine at Bristol University in 1976. After qualifying, she worked as a clinical ophthalmologist in Bristol Eye Hospital for 3 years, and then in Leeds and Bradford for 7 years. She then worked as an MD in the Department of Pathology at the Institute of Ophthalmology, London (1987-1990). During this time she took part in a clinical trial of Mectizan for the treatment of onchocerciasis in Sierra Leone. This confirmed her desire to pursue a career in international eye health.

In 1990, she joined the International Centre for Eye Health (ICEH), Department of Preventive Ophthalmology at the Institute of Ophthalmology, and in 1995 completed an MSc in Epidemiology at LSHTM. In 2002 the group moved to the London School of Hygiene & Tropical Medicine. Gilbert co-directed ICEH between 2002 and 2020. Gilbert was appointed as Professor of International Eye Health in 2008.

Research
Gilbert's research focus is on the frequency, causes, and control of blinding eye diseases in children in low and middle-income countries. One of Gilbert's contributions was to develop a system for classifying the causes of blindness in children in collaboration with the World Health Organization (WHO). Data collected by Gilbert and others raised awareness of the regional variation in the causes and magnitude of blindness in children, and control became one of the priorities of the global strategy of WHO and the International Agency for the Prevention of Blindness to eliminate avoidable blindness, VISION 2020 – the Right to Sight. Gilbert's research findings have been crucial for the development and planning of eye care programs for children in Africa, Asia, and Latin America.

Much of Gilbert's research has focused on retinopathy of prematurity (ROP), a blinding eye condition that can affect infants born preterm. She was the first to describe ROP occurring in low and middle-income countries and described the 3rd epidemic of ROP blindness. Cataracts in children and refractive errors are other areas of research interest.

Other areas of Gilbert's research include national population-based surveys of blindness and visual impairment in Pakistan, Nigeria, and Sri Lanka, glaucoma, and school eye health.

Gilbert has published over 350 papers in peer-reviewed journals and has written 27 book chapters. She has supervised 13 Ph.D./MD students and examined 12 Ph.D. candidates from other universities.

Programme development
Gilbert has led or taken part in almost 40 national regional workshops designed to bring together all the experts and agencies responsible for preterm infants. This has led to the development of new programmes in some countries, and to the expansion or improvement of services in others. Gilbert also initiated and led a large-scale pilot project for ROP in India, supported by the Queen Elizabeth Diamond Jubilee Trust between 2012 and 2019.

Teaching
At the Institute of Ophthalmology, Gilbert led the Masters in Community Eye Health. At the London School of Hygiene & Tropical Medicine, she runs a module on the Masters in Public Health for Eye Care on blinding eye diseases in children and is on the Board of Examiners. She is a member of the Editorial Committee for the Community Eye Health Journal and contributed to the development of a Massive Online Open Access Course on ROP.

Technical advisor 
Gilbert is a technical/scientific advisor to a number of organisations, including the World Health Organization; USAID's Child Blindness Program; the International Pediatric Ophthalmology and Strabismus Council; the School Eye Health Rapid Assessment project, USAID; iHOPE, Welcome Trust, India; Velux Stiftung, Switzerland; and the Vision Impact Institute. She has been involved with a number of working groups for the International Agency for the Prevention of Blindness and led the development of school eye health guidelines for low and middle-income countries.

Awards
 Honorary Fellow, West African College of Surgeons, 2004
 Outstanding Contribution, International Agency for the Prevention of Blindness, 2004
 International Prevention of Blindness Award, American Academy of Ophthalmology, 2011
 Pisart Vision Award, Lighthouse International, 2012
 L’Occitane Sight Award, L’Occitane Foundation, 2013
 Jules Francois Golden Award, International Council of Ophthalmology, 2016 
 Lifetime Achievement Award, Royal National Institute for Blind People, 2017
 Barrie Jones Lecture and Award, Royal College of Ophthalmologists, 2018
 SPROP Prevention of Blindness Award, Sociedad Panamericana de Retinopatía del Prematuro, 2019
 2020 Power List - Top 100, The Ophthalmologist, 2020
 Vision Excellence Award, International Agency for the Prevention of Blindness, 2020
 Honorary Fellowship, Royal College of Ophthalmologists, 2021
 2021 Power List - Top 100 Women in Ophthalmology, The Ophthalmologist, 2021

References

Year of birth missing (living people)
Living people
British ophthalmologists
Vision scientists
Women vision scientists
Women ophthalmologists